Barry George Cooper (born 30 November 1958) is a former New Zealand cricketer who played 62 first-class matches for Northern Districts in the 1980s and in the 1990s. He also played for Northland in the Hawke Cup.

Cooper was born in Whangarei and attended Whangarei Boys High School. A right-handed batsman, he scored 2,982 runs at a batting average of 28.13 runs per innings in first class matches. The highest score of his four centuries, an unbeaten 116 runs, came against an England touring  side in 1988. He took 26 wickets with his off breaks, with his only five wicket haul, 5 wickets for the cost of 40 runs, coming against Otago. He scored 2,009 runs in 80 list A one-day matches with one century and took 34 one day wickets. He played for Derbyshire Second XI in 1980 and 1981.

Cooper now coaches cricket in Whangarei. His son Henry has played for Northern Districts since the 2016/17 season.

References

External links
 

1958 births
Living people
New Zealand cricketers
Northern Districts cricketers
Cricketers from Whangārei
People educated at Whangarei Boys' High School
North Island cricketers